Unni Vanna Divasam is a 1984 Indian Malayalam film, directed by Rajan Balakrishnan and produced by K. G. Mohan. The film stars Sukumari, Sankaradi, Captain Raju and Rajkumar in the lead roles. The film has musical score by A. T. Ummer. The film was dubbed in Tamil as Love Birds.

Cast
Sukumari as Sharada
Sankaradi as Kurup
Captain Raju as Ashok
Rajkumar as Unni
Suhasini as Anu
Charuhasan as Nair

Soundtrack
The music was composed by A. T. Ummer and the lyrics were written by Devadas.

References

External links
 

1984 films
1980s Malayalam-language films